Members of the third National Assembly were elected on 27 July 2003.

Composition

List of members
 Cambodian People's Party
 FUNCINPEC
 Sam Rainsy Party

Source: National Election Committee (archive)

Lists of political office-holders in Cambodia